Tincup, or Tin Cup, originally named Virginia City, is an unincorporated community in Gunnison County, Colorado, United States. The community was once a prominent mining town, but is now a community of summer homes with a few year-round residents. Many historic buildings are still standing and kept up.  The only business or service in Tincup is a small store, open only during the summer months.

History
In October 1859, prospector Jim Taylor panned some gold from Willow Creek, and carried it back to camp in a tin cup; he named the valley “Tin Cup Gulch.” For years the area was the site of seasonal placer mining, but no year-round communities were established, partly because of the danger of Indian attack.

In 1878, lode deposits were discovered in the area, and the town of Virginia City was laid out in March 1879. By the 1880 census, the town had a population of 1,495. As Virginia City, it was incorporated in August 1880, but confusion with Virginia City, Nevada, and Virginia City, Montana, caused the residents to change the name. The town was reincorporated in July 1882 as Tin Cup.		

Early Tin Cup was a violent place. Town marshal Harry Rivers died in a gunfight in 1882, and marshal Andy Jameson was shot to death in 1883.

The town population declined when the mines were exhausted. The post office closed in 1918, and the last town election was held in 1918.

The Boothill Cemetery is located just south of the town.

The Great Divide passes through Tincup, creating Tincup Pass.

Location

See also
List of ghost towns in Colorado
Cumberland Pass
Blistered Horn Mill, Colorado

References

External links
 Tincup, Colorado, includes photo gallery
GhostTowns.com: Tin Cup, Colorado
Tincup

Unincorporated communities in Gunnison County, Colorado
Unincorporated communities in Colorado
Ghost towns in Colorado
Boot Hill cemeteries